Almala is a village in Latur district in the state of Maharashtra, India.

Youth Leader Almala
Mauli Lonare Is The Youth Leader Of Almala
Mauli Bhau Yuva Manch Almala.

Education 
Almala has Vishweshwarayya Polytechnic College, Shivlingeshwar College of Pharmacy and Dagadojirao Deshmukh College of Pharmacy.

Almala has Vedang Dharashive's School of Music which offers Indian Classical music courses for local and international students. On line lessons available as well.

References

Neighbourhoods in Latur
Villages in Latur district

Villages_in_Ausa_taluka